Joseph Cameron Finley (born August 30, 1987) is an American former child actor and molecular biologist. While receiving accolades for his work in Hope Floats, Baywatch, One True Love, and Perfect Game, he is most known for his role as Theodore 'Beaver' Cleaver in the 1997 film Leave It to Beaver based upon the television series by the same name.

Background
Finley was born in Garland, Texas, the son of Lexa Iann (née Aulgur), a spiritual healer, and Charles David "Chuck" Finley, a software developer. He has two siblings, Taz and Stopher. When he was three, he was taken by his parents to an acting seminar near his home. He continued acting until the age of 12, at which time he chose to quit acting so he could go to school full-time and "be a normal kid".

Finley attended Moorpark High School.  He graduated in 2010 from UC San Diego with a degree in molecular biology. He currently resides in Brooklyn, NY.

Career
Finley starred in his first national commercial, for Shell Oil, 
when he was three years old and living with his family in the Dallas suburb of Garland, Texas. 
He also featured in commercials for such companies as Taco Bell, Shout, and Brink's Security. Finley acted in the films What's Eating Gilbert Grape, A Perfect World, 8 Seconds, and appeared as a guest on The Tonight Show with Jay Leno on three occasions. In 1997, after beating out more than 5,000 other boys in a nationwide search, Finley played the title character in the Leave It to Beaver film. 
He then appeared in Hope Floats as Travis, a sad child who dresses up as a dozen different characters ranging from Barney the Dinosaur to Charlie Chaplin. 
In 1995 Finley was one of the 3,000 actors that auditioned for the role of young Anakin Skywalker in Star Wars: Episode I – The Phantom Menace. Finley also starred in the 2000 direct-to-video Disney movie Perfect Game, in which he played Kanin, a boy driven by the ghost of his deceased father to show that he can play baseball as well as anyone on the championship Little League team.

Since leaving acting in 2000, Cameron graduated from high school and went to study at the University of California, San Diego. He has worked as a researcher in molecular biology, and has published a number of academic research articles in his field.

Filmography

Film

Television

Recognition

Awards and nominations
 1998, won Lone Star Film & Television Awards 'Rising Star Actor'
 1998, The Hollywood Reporter YoungStar Awards nomination for 'Best Performance by a Young Actor in a Comedy Film' for Leave It to Beaver
 1998, The Hollywood Reporter YoungStar Awards nomination for 'Best Performance by a Young Actor in a Comedy Film' for Hope Floats
 1998, Young Artist Awards nomination for 'Best Performance in a Feature Film - Young Actor Age Ten or Under' for Leave It to Beaver
 1999, Young Artist Awards nomination for 'Best Performance in a Feature Film - Young Actor Age Ten or Under' for Hope Floats
 2000, Young Artist Awards nomination for 'Best Performance in a TV Drama Series - Supporting Young Actor' for Baywatch
 2001, Young Artist Awards nomination for 'Best Performance in a TV Movie (Drama) - Supporting Young Actor' for One True Love
 2001, Won 'Best Child Actor' at International Family Film Festival (formerly Santa Clarita International Film Festival) for Perfect Game

References

External links 
 
 Unofficial Homepage

1987 births
Living people
20th-century American male actors
21st-century American male actors
American male child actors
American male film actors
American molecular biologists
Male actors from Texas
People from Garland, Texas
University of California, San Diego alumni